This List of hills of Brandenburg shows a selection of well-known hills in the German federal state of Brandenburg – sorted by height in metres above Normalnull (NN):

Name, Height, Location (District(s) / Landscape Region)

 Heidehöhe (201.4 m; highest point in Brandenburg on the Heideberg hill whose summit lies in Saxony, 206.1 m), District Elbe-Elster, in the landscape region of Schraden
 Kutschenberg (200.7 m), Oberspreewald-Lausitz District, in the landscape region of Schraden, west of Ortrand, Kmehlener Berge
 Hagelberg (200.2 m), Potsdam-Mittelmark District, High Fläming, west of Belzig
 Dietzenberg (191 m), Oberspreewald-Lausitz District, Oberlausitz, near Ortrand
 Hoher Berg (186 m), Spree-Neiße District, near Döbern
 Golmberg (178 m), Teltow-Fläming District, Lower Fläming, near Stülpe (municipality of Nuthe-Urstromtal)
 Brandberg (175 m), Muskauer Faltenbogen, near Döbern
 Wache Berge (172 m), Potsdam-Mittelmark District
 Hutberg (162 m), Oder-Spree District, southwest of Eisenhüttenstadt
 Kesselberg (161 m), Oberspreewald-Lausitz District, Cabeler Berge, near Calau
 Semmelberg (158 m), District Märkisch-Oderland, between Wollenberg and Platzfelde
 Rauensche Berge (153 m), Oder-Spree District, near Fürstenwalde
 Güterbank (153 m), District Elbe-Elster, in the landscape region of Schraden, Elsterwerda
 Babbener Berge (152 m), District Elbe-Elster, near Finsterwalde
 Dubrower Berge (150 m), Oder-Spree District, between Langewahl and Bad Saarow
 Wehlaberg (144 m), Dahme-Spreewald District, Krausnick hills, near Lübben
 Schwarzer Berg (144 m)
 Gehrener Berge (140 m), Dahme-Spreewald District, near Luckau
 Hirschberge (135 m)
 Börnickenberg (129 m), Teltow-Fläming District, southeast of Jüterbog
 Krugberg (129 m), Märkisch-Oderland District, Mark Switzerland
 Butterberg (128), Prignitz District, near Boddin-Langow
 Kronsberge (125 m), Prignitz District, southwest of Pritzwalk
 Wietkiekenberg (124.7 m), Potsdam-Mittelmark District, highest point of the Zauche, near Schwielowsee-Ferch
 Pimpinellenberg (117 m), im Barnim District, near Oderberg
 Kahle Glatze (116 m), Spree-Neiße District, Kaltenborn Hills, near Guben
 Kleiner Ravensberg (114.2 m), Saarmund end moraine arc, in Potsdam
 Wahrberge (114 m), between Klein and Groß Woltersdorf, south of Pritzwalk, Prignitz District 
 Weinberg (Fredenwalde) (111 m), Groß Fredenwalde, Uckermark
 Blocksberge (110.6 m), Dahme-Spreewald District, near Alt Schadow
 Marienberg (110.0 m), Dahme-Spreewald District, near Krugau, am Ostrand des Unterspreewalds
 Eichberge (108.9 m), Teltow-Fläming District, near Wünsdorf
 Götzer Berg (108.6 m), Potsdam-Mittelmark District, Gemarkung of Groß Kreutz
 Großer Ravensberg (108.2 m), Saarmund end moraine arc, near Potsdam
 Löwendorfer Berg (104 m), west of Trebbin, Teltow-Fläming District
 Kranichsberg (105 m), near Woltersdorf, Oder-Spree District
 Teufelsberg (92.7), Havelland District, between Stechow, Kotzen and Nennhausen
 Rollberge (90.5), Havelland District, near Rathenow
 Eichelberg (89.6), Potsdam-Mittelmark District, near Deetz
 Rauhe Berge (86 m), Potsdam-Mittelmark District, in the landscape region of Zauche, near Lehnin Abbey
 Kleiner Rummelsberg (81 m; possibly a drumlin, disputed), end moraine arc of Chorin, near Chorin-Brodowin, Barnim District
Pfingstberg (76 m), City of Potsdam
Ruinenberg (74.1 m), City of Potsdam
 Marienberg (69 m), in Brandenburg an der Havel

External links 
 lds-bb.de: high points in the state of Brandenburg as at 31.12.2005

See also 
 List of mountain and hill ranges in Germany
 List of the highest mountains in Germany
 List of the highest points of the German states

!
Brandenburg
Mount